Saint Joseph's Catholic Church Larkana is the only church of the local Catholic Christian community. The church was built in Larkana, Sindh, Pakistan, in 1984.

Christian Community in Sindh
The Christian community in Sindh is 294,885 according to the 2017 census, which is 0.85% total percentage of the Catholic population in Pakistan. In Sindh every district Christian community has lower scale job, in Larkana, almost 700 Catholic community live and have own colony which is known as Christian colony. One school named Saint Joseph High School Larkana in honor of the Christian community.

References

Roman Catholic churches in Pakistan
Larkana District
Religious buildings and structures in Sindh
1984 establishments in Pakistan